The 1978 Arizona State Sun Devils football team was an American football team that represented Arizona State University in the Pacific-10 Conference (Pac-10) during the 1978 NCAA Division I-A football season. In their 21st season under head coach Frank Kush, the Sun Devils compiled a 9–3 record (4–3 against Pac-10 opponents), finished in a tie for fourth place in the Pac-10, and outscored their opponents by a combined total of 347 to 236.

The team's statistical leaders included Mark Malone with 1,305 passing yards and 705 rushing yards and Chris DeFrance with 617 receiving yards.

Schedule

Personnel

Season summary

USC

    
    
    
    
    

Mark Malone 19 Rush, 141 Yds
Bob Kohrs 3 Fum Rec

Arizona
Mark Malone threw a pair of touchdown passes and Bill Zivic's 45-yard field goal attempt missed wide left in the final seconds to secure the Sun Devil victory.

Garden State Bowl

MVP: John Mistler

References

External links
 Game program: Arizona State vs. Washington State at Spokane – September 23, 1978 

Arizona State
Arizona State Sun Devils football seasons
Arizona State Sun Devils football